Cpl. Oliver Hughes (January 21, 1844 – January 5, 1911) of the Union Army's 12th Kentucky Infantry was awarded the Medal of Honor for action, which culminated in his 20 February 1865 capture of the Confederate States Army's 11th South Carolina's flag.

See also

 List of American Civil War Medal of Honor recipients: G–L

References

External links
 

1844 births
1911 deaths
Union Army soldiers
United States Army Medal of Honor recipients
American Civil War recipients of the Medal of Honor